Astrit Ziu (born 8 July 1946) is an Albanian retired footballer who played as a left back and made six appearances for the Albania national team.

Club career
Ziu started his career at hometown club Tomori Berat, before joining the military and thus army team Partizani Tirana in 1966. With Partizani he won a league title and 3 domestic cups. He also had a season on loan with Luftëtari. He has played at leftback for club and country but also in any other position except between the goalposts.

International career
Ziu made his debut for Albania on 13 December 1970 in a UEFA Euro 1972 qualifying match against Turkey, in which he scored Albania's only goal in the 1–2 loss. He went on to make six appearances, scoring one goal, before making his last appearance on 21 June 1972 in a 1974 FIFA World Cup qualification match against Finland, which finished as a 0–1 loss.

Career statistics

International

International goals

Personal life
Ziu has a son and a daughter and he has lived 12 years in Barcelona, Spain, before returning to Albania. After his playing career he worked as a sports instructor in the army and for the military press. He also was chief at Partizani and works as a coach for UD Vista Alegre Castelldefels during his years in Spain.

Honours
Albanian Superliga: 1
 1971

Albanian Cup: 3
 1968, 1970, 1973

References

External links
 
 
 

1946 births
Living people
Sportspeople from Berat
Association football fullbacks
Association football utility players
Albanian footballers
Albania under-21 international footballers
Albania international footballers
FK Tomori Berat players
FK Partizani Tirana players
Luftëtari Gjirokastër players
Kategoria Superiore players